Flight 358 may refer to

TWA Flight 358, hijacked on 11 June 1971
Avensa Flight 358, 22 December 1974
China Airlines Flight 358, 29 December 1991
Air France Flight 358, crashed on 2 August 2005

0358